The Kabbad refers to a citron-like fruit or citrus hybrid which was first described in 1963 by the Moroccan professor Henri Chapot, in his article named "Le Cédrat Kabbad et deux autres variétés de cédrat", who remarked it to be a biological hybrid between the citron and the orange sourcing from Damascus, Syria.

Following is from The Citrus Industry vol. 1 Chap.4:

References

External links
Photo of a kabbad
Kabbat at Agris, Food and Agriculture Organization of the UN
The Arabian Nights: Tales of 1,001 Nights: Volume 3
"What Is This Armenian Mystery Fruit?"

Citrus hybrids